Carlos Monteiro may refer to:

Carlos Monteiro (runner), Portuguese athlete
Carlos Monteiro (footballer), Bolivian footballer, see Copa Libertadores 2007 – Group 5